Amynanda was a town of ancient Caria. Amynanda appears in the Athenian tribute lists and paid an annual tribute of 50 drachmae, 5 obol.
 
Its site is located near Alakilise, Asiatic Turkey.

References

Populated places in ancient Caria
Former populated places in Turkey